Riverview Cemetery can refer to:
in the United States
(sorted by state)

 Riverview Cemetery (Wilmington, Delaware), listed on the National Register of Historic Places (NRHP) in New Castle County
 Riverview Cemetery, Ogle County, Illinois 
 Riverview Cemetery (McCone County, Montana)
 Riverview Cemetery (Hamilton, Montana) in Hamilton, Montana
 Riverview Cemetery (Richland County, Montana)
 Riverview Cemetery (Roosevelt County, Montana)
 Riverview Cemetery (Trenton, New Jersey)
 River View Cemetery (Portland, Oregon)

 Riverview Cemetery, Charlottesville, Virginia